Scincella nigrofasciata  is a species of skink found in Cambodia.

References

Scincella
Reptiles described in 2018
Taxa named by Thy Neang
Taxa named by Somaly Chan
Taxa named by Nikolay A. Poyarkov Jr.